The Tepehuas are an indigenous people of Mexico whose name means in Nahuatl, "people of the mountain", although they refer to themselves without a term or name that encompasses a supposed ethnic group. They also use endoethnonyms that originate in Spanish-influenced Nahuatl:
 masipijní: the Tepehua people
 hamasipiní: who lives on a hill
 hamasip: owners of hills
They mainly live in the three Mexican states of Hidalgo, Veracruz and Puebla.

Location 
The Tepehua territory covers a narrow area and other eastern slopes of Sierra Madre Oriental. There are essentially three Tepehua regions:
 Huehuetla, Hidalgo
 Tlachichilco, Veracruz 
 Pisaflores, Veracruz

The Tepehuas are made up of two distinct ethnolinguistic groups:
 Tepehua del occidental (western), in Tlachichilco, Zontecomatlán and, to a lesser extent, Texcatepec.
 Tepehua suroriental (southeastern), dispersed in Hidalgo, Puebla and Veracruz. In turn, the southeastern Tepehua ethnic group is subdivided into three:
 Tepehua meridional (southern): in the municipality of Huehuetla.
 Tepehua oriental (eastern): for centuries in the municipality of Ixhuatlán de Madero and later, during the second half of the 20th century, they moved to settle in Francisco Z. Mena (Puebla) and Pánuco (Veracruz)
 Tepehua poblano (Puebla): at the beginning of the 20th century this group came from Huehuetla (Hidalgo) to settle in Totonac communities of the Puebla municipalities of Francisco Z. Mena, Venustiano Carranza and mostly Pantepec.

Notes 

Indigenous peoples in Mexico
Mesoamerican cultures